Holiday in Spain can refer to:

 Holiday in Spain (album), a 1999 music album by Machine Translations
 "Holiday in Spain" (song), a 2004 song by Counting Crows and Bløf
 Scent of Mystery, a 1960 mystery film that featured the one and only use of Smell-O-Vision, later retitled as Holiday in Spain
 Public holidays in Spain